Gerald Dreyer (22 September 1929 – 5 September 1985) was a boxer from Pretoria, South Africa, who competed in the Lightweight division during his career as an amateur.

Amateur career
Dreyer was the Olympic Gold Medallist at lightweight in London 1948, defeating Joseph Vissers of Belgium in the final.

Below are Gerald Dreyer's bouts from the 1948 Olympic Games:

 Round of 32: bye
 Round of 16: defeated Ernesto Porto (Philippines) on points
 Quarterfinal: defeated Øivind Breiby (Norway) on points
 Semifinal: defeated Svend Wad (Denmark) on points
 Final: defeated Joseph Vissers (Belgium) on points (won gold medal)

Pro career
Dreyer turned pro in 1948 and fought primarily in New York City late in his career, retiring in 1955 after having won 41, lost 8, and drawn 2 with 23 Knockouts. Dreyer won the Commonwealth (British Empire) lightweight title beating Cliff Curvis over 15 rounds at Rand Stadium, Johannesburg on 8 December 1952.

External links
 databaseOlympics

References

1929 births
1985 deaths
Lightweight boxers
Olympic boxers of South Africa
Boxers at the 1948 Summer Olympics
Olympic medalists in boxing
Olympic gold medalists for South Africa
Medalists at the 1948 Summer Olympics
Sportspeople from Pretoria
South African male boxers
White South African people